Paradise Lost is an epic poem in blank verse by the 17th-century English poet John Milton (1608–1674). The first version, published in 1667, consists of ten books with over ten thousand lines of verse. A second edition followed in 1674, arranged into twelve books (in the manner of Virgil's Aeneid) with minor revisions throughout. It is considered to be Milton's masterpiece, and it helped solidify his reputation as one of the greatest English poets of all time. The poem concerns the biblical story of the fall of man; the temptation of Adam and Eve by the fallen angel Satan and their expulsion from the Garden of Eden.

Composition

In his introduction to the Penguin edition of Paradise Lost, the Milton scholar John Leonard notes: "John Milton was nearly sixty when he published Paradise Lost in 1667. The biographer John Aubrey (1626–1697) tells us that the poem was begun in about 1658 and finished in about 1663. However, parts were almost certainly written earlier, and its roots lie in Milton's earliest youth." Leonard speculates that the English Civil War interrupted Milton's earliest attempts to start his "epic [poem] that would encompass all space and time".

Leonard also notes that Milton "did not at first plan to write a biblical epic". Since epics were typically written about heroic kings and queens (and with pagan gods), Milton originally envisioned his epic to be based on a legendary Saxon or British king like the legend of King Arthur.

Having gone blind in 1652, Milton wrote Paradise Lost entirely through dictation with the help of amanuenses and friends. He also wrote the epic poem while often ill, suffering from gout, and suffering emotionally after the early death of his second wife, Katherine Woodcock, in 1658, and their infant daughter.

Structure
In the 1667 version of Paradise Lost, the poem was divided into ten books. However, in the 1674 edition, the text was reorganized into twelve books. In later printing, "Arguments" (brief summaries) were inserted at the beginning of each book.

Synopsis

The poem follows the epic tradition of starting in medias res (in the midst of things), the background story being recounted later.

Milton's story has two narrative arcs, one about Satan (Lucifer) and the other, Adam and Eve. It begins after Satan and the other fallen angels have been defeated and banished to Hell, or, as it is also called in the poem, Tartarus. In Pandæmonium, the capital city of Hell, Satan employs his rhetorical skill to organise his followers; he is aided by Mammon and Beelzebub. Belial, Chemosh, and Moloch are also present. At the end of the debate, Satan volunteers to corrupt the newly created Earth and God's new and most favoured creation, Mankind. He braves the dangers of the Abyss alone, in a manner reminiscent of Odysseus or Aeneas. After an arduous traversal of the Chaos outside Hell, he enters God's new material World, and later the Garden of Eden.

At several points in the poem, an Angelic War over Heaven is recounted from different perspectives. Satan's rebellion follows the epic convention of large-scale warfare. The battles between the faithful angels and Satan's forces take place over three days. At the final battle, the Son of God single-handedly defeats the entire legion of angelic rebels and banishes them from Heaven. Following this purge, God creates the World, culminating in his creation of Adam and Eve. While God gave Adam and Eve total freedom and power to rule over all creation, he gave them one explicit command: not to eat from the tree of the knowledge of good and evil on penalty of death.

The story of Adam and Eve's temptation and fall is a fundamentally different, new kind of epic: a domestic one. Adam and Eve are presented as having a romantic and sexual relationship while still being without sin. They have passions and distinct personalities. Satan, disguised in the form of a serpent, successfully tempts Eve to eat from the Tree by preying on her vanity and tricking her with rhetoric. Adam, learning that Eve has sinned, knowingly commits the same sin. He declares to Eve that since she was made from his flesh, they are bound to one another – if she dies, he must also die. In this manner, Milton portrays Adam as a heroic figure, but also as a greater sinner than Eve, as he is aware that what he is doing is wrong.

After eating the fruit, Adam and Eve have lustful sex. At first, Adam is convinced that Eve was right in thinking that eating the fruit would be beneficial. However, they soon fall asleep and have terrible nightmares, and after they awake, they experience guilt and shame for the first time. Realising that they have committed a terrible act against God, they engage in mutual recrimination.

Meanwhile, Satan returns triumphantly to Hell, amid the praise of his fellow fallen angels. He tells them about how their scheme worked and Mankind has fallen, giving them complete dominion over Paradise. As he finishes his speech, however, the fallen angels around him become hideous snakes, and soon enough, Satan himself turns into a snake, deprived of limbs and unable to talk. Thus, they share the same punishment, as they shared the same guilt.

Eve appeals to Adam for reconciliation of their actions. Her encouragement enables them to approach God, and sue for grace, bowing on supplicant knee, to receive forgiveness.  In a vision shown to him by the Archangel Michael, Adam witnesses everything that will happen to Mankind until the Great Flood. Adam is very upset by this vision of the future, so Michael also tells him about Mankind's potential redemption from original sin through Jesus Christ (whom Michael calls "King Messiah").

Adam and Eve are cast out of Eden, and Michael says that Adam may find "a paradise within thee, happier far". Adam and Eve now have a more distant relationship with God, who is omnipresent but invisible (unlike the tangible Father in the Garden of Eden).

[[File:MILTON (1695) p362 PL 12.jpg|thumb|Image extracted from page 362 of The Poetical Works of John Milton. Containing Paradise Lost. Paradise Regained. Samson Agonistes, and his Poems on several occasions, by Milton, John, Michael Burghers (1695)]]

Characters
Satan

Satan, formerly called Lucifer, is the first major character introduced in the poem. He is a tragic figure who famously declares: "Better to reign in Hell than serve in Heaven" (1.263). Following his vain rebellion against God he is cast out from Heaven and condemned to Hell. The rebellion stems from Satan's pride and envy (5.660ff.).

Opinions on the character are often sharply divided. Milton presents Satan as the origin of all evil, but readers have historically struggled with accepting this interpretation. Romanticist critics in particular, among them William Blake, Lord Byron, Percy Bysshe Shelley, and William Hazlitt, are known for reading Satan as the "true hero" of Paradise Lost. This has led other critics, such as C. S. Lewis and Charles Williams, both of whom were devout Christians, to argue against reading Satan as a sympathetic, heroic figure. John Carey argues that this conflict cannot be solved, because the character of Satan exists in more modes and greater depth than the other characters of Paradise Lost: in this way, Milton has created an ambivalent character, and any "pro-Satan" or "anti-Satan" argument is by its nature discarding half the evidence. Satan's ambivalence, Carey says, is "a precondition of the poem's success a major factor in the attention it has aroused".

Adam
Adam is the first human created by God. Adam requests a companion from God:  God approves his request then creates Eve. God appoints Adam and Eve to rule over all the creatures of the world and to reside in the Garden of Eden.

Adam is more gregarious than Eve and yearns for her company. He is completely infatuated with her. Raphael advises him to "take heed lest Passion sway / Thy Judgment" (5.635–636). But Adam's great love for Eve contributes to his disobedience to God.

Unlike the biblical Adam, before Milton's Adam leaves Paradise he is given a glimpse of the future of mankind by the Archangel Michael, which includes stories from the Old and New Testaments.

Eve
Eve is the second human created by God. God takes one of Adam's ribs and shapes it into Eve. Whether Eve is actually inferior to Adam is a vexed point. She is often unwilling to be submissive. Eve may be the more intelligent of the two. She is generally happy, but longs for knowledge, specifically for self-knowledge. When she first met Adam she turned away, more interested in herself. She had been looking at her reflection in a lake before being led invisibly to Adam. Recounting this to Adam she confesses that she found him less enticing than her reflection (4.477-480).

Nonetheless, Adam later explains this to Raphael as Eve's  But Adam's judgment is not always sound. And Eve is beautiful.

Though Eve does love Adam she may feel suffocated by his constant presence. Eve feels the need to be on her own and explore her individuality. In Book 9 she convinces Adam to separate for a time to work in different parts of the Garden. In her solitude she is deceived by Satan. Satan in the serpent leads Eve to the forbidden tree then persuades her that he has eaten of its fruit and gained knowledge and that she should do the same. She is not easily persuaded to eat, but is hungry in body and in mind.

The Son of God

The Son of God is the spirit who will become incarnate as Jesus Christ, though he is never named explicitly because he has not yet entered human form. Milton believed in a subordinationist doctrine of Christology that regarded the Son as secondary to the Father and as God's "great Vice-regent" (5.609).

Milton's God in Paradise Lost refers to the Son as "My word, my wisdom, and effectual might" (3.170). The poem is not explicitly anti-trinitarian, but it is consistent with Milton's convictions. The Son is the ultimate hero of the epic and is infinitely powerful—he single-handedly defeats Satan and his followers and drives them into Hell. After their fall, the Son of God tells Adam and Eve about God's judgment. Before their fall the Father foretells their "Treason" (3.207) and that Man

The Father then asks whether there "Dwels in all Heaven charitie so deare?" (3.216) And the Son volunteers himself.

In the final book a vision of Salvation through the Son is revealed to Adam by Michael. The name Jesus of Nazareth, and the details of Jesus' story are not depicted in the poem, though they are alluded to. Michael explains that "Joshua, whom the Gentiles Jesus call", prefigures the Son of God, "his name and office bearing" to "quell / The adversarie Serpent, and bring back [...] long wander[e]d man / Safe to eternal Paradise of rest".

God the Father
God the Father is the creator of Heaven, Hell, the world, of everyone and everything there is, through the agency of His Son. Milton presents God as all-powerful and all-knowing, as an infinitely great being who cannot be overthrown by even the great army of angels Satan incites against him. Milton portrays God as often conversing about his plans and his motives for his actions with the Son of God. The poem shows God creating the world in the way Milton believed it was done, that is, God created Heaven, Earth, Hell, and all the creatures that inhabit these separate planes from part of Himself, not out of nothing. Thus, according to Milton, the ultimate authority of God over all things that happen derives from his being the "author" of all creation. Satan tries to justify his rebellion by denying this aspect of God and claiming self-creation, but he admits to himself the truth otherwise, and that God "deserved no such return / From me, whom He created what I was"..

 Raphael 

Raphael is an archangel who is sent by God to Eden in order to strengthen Adam and Eve against Satan. He tells a heroic tale about the War in Heaven that takes up most of Book 6 of Paradise Lost. Ultimately, the story told by Raphael, in which Satan is portrayed as bold and decisive, does not prepare Adam and Eve to counter Satan's subtle temptations and may even have caused the Fall in the first place.

Michael
Michael is an archangel who is preeminent in military prowess. He leads in battle and uses a sword which was "giv'n him temperd so, that neither keen / Nor solid might resist that edge" (6.322–323).

God sends Michael to Eden, charging him:

He is also charged with establishing a guard for Paradise.

When Adam sees him coming he describes him to Eve as

Themes
Marriage

Milton first presented Adam and Eve in Book IV with impartiality. The relationship between Adam and Eve is one of "mutual dependence, not a relation of domination or hierarchy". While the author placed Adam above Eve in his intellectual knowledge and, in turn, his relation to God, he granted Eve the benefit of knowledge through experience. Hermine Van Nuis clarifies, that although there was stringency specified for the roles of male and female, Adam and Eve unreservedly accept their designated roles. Rather than viewing these roles as forced upon them, each uses their assignment as an asset in their relationship with each other. These distinctions can be interpreted as Milton's view on the importance of mutuality between husband and wife.

When examining the relationship between Adam and Eve, some critics apply either an Adam-centered or Eve-centered view of hierarchy and importance to God. David Mikics argues, by contrast, these positions "overstate the independence of the characters' stances, and therefore miss the way in which Adam and Eve are entwined with each other". Milton's narrative depicts a relationship where the husband and wife (here, Adam and Eve) depend on each other and, through each other's differences, thrive.
Still, there are several instances where Adam communicates directly with God while Eve must go through Adam to God; thus, some have described Adam as her guide.

Although Milton does not directly mention divorce, critics posit theories on Milton's view of divorce based upon their inferences from the poem and from his tracts on divorce written earlier in his life. Other works by Milton suggest he viewed marriage as an entity separate from the church. Discussing Paradise Lost, Biberman entertains the idea that "marriage is a contract made by both the man and the woman". These ideas imply Milton may have favored that both man and woman have equal access to marriage and to divorce.

Idolatry
Milton's 17th-century contemporaries by and large criticised his ideas and considered him as a radical, mostly because of his republican political views and heterodox theological opinions. One of Milton's most controversial arguments centred on his concept of what is idolatrous, which subject is deeply embedded in Paradise Lost.

Milton's first criticism of idolatry focused on the constructing of temples and other buildings to serve as places of worship. In Book XI of Paradise Lost, Adam tries to atone for his sins by offering to build altars to worship God. In response, the angel Michael explains that Adam does not need to build physical objects to experience the presence of God. Joseph Lyle points to this example, explaining: "When Milton objects to architecture, it is not a quality inherent in buildings themselves he finds offensive, but rather their tendency to act as convenient loci to which idolatry, over time, will inevitably adhere." Even if the idea is pure in nature, Milton thought it would unavoidably lead to idolatry simply because of the nature of humans. That is, instead of directing their thoughts towards God, humans will turn to erected objects and falsely invest their faith there. While Adam attempts to build an altar to God, critics note Eve is similarly guilty of idolatry, but in a different manner. Harding believes Eve's narcissism and obsession with herself constitutes idolatry. Specifically, Harding claims that "under the serpent's influence, Eve's idolatry and self-deification foreshadow the errors into which her 'Sons' will stray". Much like Adam, Eve falsely places her faith in herself, the Tree of Knowledge, and to some extent the Serpent, all of which do not compare to the ideal nature of God.

Milton made his views on idolatry more explicit with the creation of Pandæmonium and his allusion to Solomon's temple. In the beginning of Paradise Lost and throughout the poem, there are several references to the rise and eventual fall of Solomon's temple. Critics elucidate that "Solomon's temple provides an explicit demonstration of how an artefact moves from its genesis in devotional practice to an idolatrous end." This example, out of the many presented, distinctly conveys Milton's views on the dangers of idolatry. Even if one builds a structure in the name of God, the best of intentions can become immoral in idolatry. The majority of these similarities revolve around a structural likeness, but as Lyle explains, they play a greater role. By linking Saint Peter's Basilica and the Pantheon to Pandemonium—an ideally false structure—the two famous buildings take on a false meaning. This comparison best represents Milton's Protestant views, as it rejects both the purely Catholic perspective and the Pagan perspective.

In addition to rejecting Catholicism, Milton revolted against the idea of a monarch ruling by divine right. He saw the practice as idolatrous. Barbara Lewalski concludes that the theme of idolatry in Paradise Lost "is an exaggerated version of the idolatry Milton had long associated with the Stuart ideology of divine kingship". In the opinion of Milton, any object, human or non-human, that receives special attention befitting of God, is considered idolatrous.

 Criticism of monarchy 
Although Satan's army inevitably loses the war against God, Satan achieves a position of power and begins his reign in Hell with his band of loyal followers, composed of fallen angels, which is described to be a "third of heaven". Similar to Milton's republican sentiments of overthrowing the King of England for both better representation and parliamentary power, Satan argues that his shared rebellion with the fallen angels is an effort to "explain the hypocrisy of God", and in doing so, they will be treated with the respect and acknowledgement that they deserve. As Wayne Rebhorn argues, "Satan insists that he and his fellow revolutionaries held their places by right and even leading him to claim that they were self-created and self-sustained" and thus Satan's position in the rebellion is much like that of his own real world creator.

Milton scholar John Leonard interpreted the "impious war" between Heaven and Hell as civil war:
Paradise Lost is, among other things, a poem about civil war. Satan raises "impious war in Heav'n" (i 43) by leading a third of the angels in revolt against God. The term "impious war" implies that civil war is impious. But Milton applauded the English people for having the courage to depose and execute King Charles I. In his poem, however, he takes the side of "Heav'n's awful Monarch" (iv 960). Critics have long wrestled with the question of why an antimonarchist and defender of regicide should have chosen a subject that obliged him to defend monarchical authority.

The editors at the Poetry Foundation argue that Milton's criticism of the English monarchy was being directed specifically at the Stuart monarchy and not at the monarchy system in general.

In a similar vein, C. S. Lewis argued that there was no contradiction in Milton's position in the poem since "Milton believed that God was his 'natural superior' and that Charles Stuart was not."

 Morality 
C. S. Lewis interpreted the poem as a genuine Christian morality tale. Other critics, like William Empson, view it as a more ambiguous work, with Milton's complex characterization of Satan playing a large part in that perceived ambiguity. Empson argued that "Milton deserves credit for making God wicked, since the God of Christianity is 'a wicked God'." Leonard places Empson's interpretation "in the [Romantic interpretive] tradition of William Blake and Percy Bysshe Shelley".

Empson's view is complex. John Leonard points out that "Empson never denies that Satan's plan is wicked. What he does deny is that God is innocent of its wickedness: 'Milton steadily drives home that the inmost counsel of God was the Fortunate Fall of man; however wicked Satan's plan may be, it is God's plan too [since God in Paradise Lost is depicted as being both omniscient and omnipotent].'" Leonard calls Empson's view "a powerful argument"; he notes that this interpretation was challenged by Dennis Danielson in his book Milton's Good God (1982).

 Style 
Milton used a number of acrostics in the poem. In Book 9, a verse describing the serpent which tempted Eve to eat the forbidden fruit in the Garden of Eden spells out "SATAN" (9.510), while elsewhere in the same book, Milton spells out "FFAALL" and "FALL" (9.333). Respectively, these probably represent the double fall of humanity embodied in Adam and Eve, as well as Satan's fall from Heaven.

Blank verse

Blank verse was not much used in the non-dramatic poetry of the 17th century until Paradise Lost, in which Milton used it with much license and tremendous skill. Milton used the flexibility of blank verse, and its capacity to support syntactic complexity, to the utmost. Milton also wrote Paradise Regained and parts of Samson Agonistes in blank verse.

Although Milton was not the first to use blank verse, his use of it was very influential and he became known for the style. When Miltonic verse became popular, Samuel Johnson mocked Milton for inspiring bad blank verse, but he recognized that Milton's verse style was very influential. Poets such as Alexander Pope, whose final, incomplete work was intended to be written in the form, and John Keats, who complained that he relied too heavily on Milton, adopted and picked up various aspects of his poetry. In particular, Miltonic blank verse became the standard for those attempting to write English epics for centuries following the publication of Paradise Lost and his later poetry. The poet Robert Bridges analyzed his versification in the monograph Milton's Prosody.

Interpretation and critique

 Eighteenth-century critics 
The writer and critic Samuel Johnson wrote that Paradise Lost shows off Milton's "peculiar power to astonish" and that Milton "seems to have been well acquainted with his own genius, and to know what it was that Nature had bestowed upon him more bountifully than upon others: the power of displaying the vast, illuminating the splendid, enforcing the awful, darkening the gloomy, and aggravating the dreadful".

William Blake famously wrote in The Marriage of Heaven and Hell: "The reason Milton wrote in fetters when he wrote of Angels & God, and at liberty when of Devils & Hell, is because he was a true Poet and of the Devil's party without knowing it." This quotation succinctly represents the way in which some 18th- and 19th-century English Romantic poets viewed Milton.

Christian epic
Tobias Gregory wrote that Milton was "the most theologically learned among early modern epic poets. He was, moreover, a theologian of great independence of mind, and one who developed his talents within a society where the problem of divine justice was debated with particular intensity." Gregory says that Milton is able to establish divine action and his divine characters in a superior way to other Renaissance epic poets, including Ludovico Ariosto or Tasso.

In Paradise Lost Milton also ignores the traditional epic format of a plot based on a mortal conflict between opposing armies with deities watching over and occasionally interfering with the action. Instead, both divinity and mortal are involved in a conflict that, while momentarily ending in tragedy, offers a future salvation. In both Paradise Lost and Paradise Regained, Milton incorporates aspects of Lucan's epic model, the epic from the view of the defeated. Although he does not accept the model completely within Paradise Regained, he incorporates the "anti-Virgilian, anti-imperial epic tradition of Lucan". Milton goes further than Lucan in this belief and "Paradise Lost and Paradise Regained carry further, too, the movement toward and valorization of romance that Lucan's tradition had begun, to the point where Milton's poems effectively create their own new genre".

Iconography

The first illustrations to accompany the text of Paradise Lost were added to the fourth edition of 1688, with one engraving prefacing each book, of which up to eight of the twelve were by Sir John Baptist Medina, one by Bernard Lens II, and perhaps up to four (including Books I and XII, perhaps the most memorable) by another hand. The engraver was Michael Burghers (given as 'Burgesse' in some sources). By 1730 the same images had been re-engraved on a smaller scale by Paul Fourdrinier.

Some of the most notable illustrators of Paradise Lost included William Blake, Gustave Doré, and Henry Fuseli. However, the epic's illustrators also include John Martin, Edward Francis Burney, Richard Westall, Francis Hayman, and many others.

Outside of book illustrations, the epic has also inspired other visual works by well-known painters like Salvador Dalí who executed a set of ten colour engravings in 1974. Milton's achievement in writing Paradise Lost while blind (he dictated to helpers) inspired loosely biographical paintings by both Fuseli and Eugène Delacroix.

See also
 Paradise Lost in popular culture
 John Milton's poetic style
 Paradise Regained Visio TnugdaliReferences
Citations

Bibliography

 
 
 
 
 
 
 
 
 
 
 

Further reading
 John Milton: A Short Introduction (2002 ed., paperback by Roy C. Flannagan, Oxford: Wiley-Blackwell, ; 2008 ed., ebook by Roy Flannagan, Massachusetts: Wiley-Blackwell)
 Al-Akhras, Sharihan; Green, Mandy (2017). Satanic whispers: Milton’s Iblis and the “Great Sultan”. The Seventeenth Century, 32:1, pp. 31–50. .
 
 
 
 
 
 
 Patrides, C. A. The Age of Milton: Backgrounds to Seventeenth-century Literature (Manchester University, 1980), .
 

External links

 Gustave Doré Paradise Lost Illustrations from the university at Buffalo Libraries
 Major Online Resources on Paradise Lost (archived 6 February 2011)
 

Online text
 
 Project Gutenberg text version 1
 Project Gutenberg text version 2

Other information
 darkness visible – comprehensive site for students and others new to Milton: contexts, plot and character summaries, reading suggestions, critical history, gallery of illustrations of Paradise Lost'', and much more. By students at Milton's Cambridge college, Christ's College.
 Selected bibliography at the Milton Reading Room – includes background, biography, criticism.

1667 books
1667 poems
1674 books
Christian poetry
Epic poems in English
Poetry by John Milton
Biblical paraphrases
Biblical poetry
Garden of Eden
Cultural depictions of Adam and Eve
Cosmogony
Fiction about God
Fiction about the Devil
Lucifer
Beelzebub
Parallel literature